Porcellionides myrmecophilus is a woodlouse that can be found on islands such as Crete, Cyprus, Cyclades, Dodecanese, North Aegean, Sardinia, Sicily, and on both Greek and Italian mainlands.

Subspecies
The species has 2 subspecies:
Porcellionides myrmecophilus graevei (Verhoeff, 1918) – endemic to Sicily
Porcellionides myrmecophilus myrmecophilus (Stein, 1859) – widespread

References

Porcellionidae
Crustaceans described in 1859
Woodlice of Europe